Mohamed Amine Tougai (born 22 January 2000) is an Algerian footballer who plays as a defender for Tunisian Ligue Professionnelle 1 club Espérance de Tunis and the Algeria national team.

Club career

Career statistics

Club

International

Honours
 Espérance de Tunis
 Tunisian Ligue Professionnelle 1 (3): 2019–20, 2020–21, 2021–22
 Tunisian Super Cup (1): 2020–21

 Algeria
FIFA Arab Cup: 2021

References

External links
 

2000 births
Living people
Algerian footballers
Association football defenders
NA Hussein Dey players
21st-century Algerian people
Espérance Sportive de Tunis players